State Route 87 (SR 87) is a secondary state highway located in Lauderdale and Haywood counties in West Tennessee.  SR 87 runs west to east through mixed terrain of bluffs and rolling hills in Lauderdale County and mostly river bottoms in Haywood County.  SR 87 is a two-lane facility throughout its length and features a 50-55 MPH speed limit depending on terrain.  This highway is also narrow and in poor condition in several locations.  This highway provides direct access to West Tennessee State Penitentiary and indirect access to Fort Pillow State Park via State Route 207.  The western terminus of SR 87 is notable due to the extreme levels of erosion from the Mississippi River that has created a very sharp and unstable "cliff" that forced TDOT to erect a barricade to stop vehicles from driving over the edge and into the river.

Route description

Lauderdale County

SR 87 begins on the banks of the Mississippi River in Lauderdale County, just north of the mouth of the Hatchie River. The highway then passes through the community of Fulton, where it has an intersection with SR 207, which provides access to Fort Pillow State Park. SR 87 continues east through wooded areas and passes by the West Tennessee State Penitentiary before coming to the community of Cherry, where it has its first intersection with SR 371. The highway then goes east through farmland and has another intersection with SR 371 before coming to an intersection with US 51/SR 3 and entering the town of Henning. SR 87 enters downtown along Graves Avenue before having a short concurrency with SR 209 (Main Street). SR 87 then leaves Henning along Mc Farland Avenue and passes just south of Durhamville before continuing east and crossing into Haywood County.

Haywood County

SR 87 continues to wind its way through farmland before entering Brownsville and coming to an end at an intersection with SR 19.

Major intersections

Points of interest (South to North)

 Fort Pillow State Park
 West Tennessee State Penitentiary

References

Tennessee Department of Transportation
Lauderdale County Highway Map
Haywood County Highway Map
West Tennessee State Penitentiary, Tennessee Department of Corrections

087
Transportation in Lauderdale County, Tennessee
Transportation in Haywood County, Tennessee